Corbin is a former rural community in St. Clair County, in the U.S. state of Missouri.  It was located in Section 8 of Polk Township, about seven miles east of Osceola.  The community site was inundated and destroyed with the creation of the Truman Reservoir.

A post office called Corbin was established in 1901, named for Jim Corbin, and remained in operation until 1933.Synhorst, Curtis H. Cultural Resources Project, Harry S. Truman Dam and Reservoir Project, Volume II Historical Resources: Historical Gazetteer and Mitigation Recommendations, US Army Corps of Engineers (1983), p. 54 (notes that Corbin post office was named at Jim Corbin, who established it) 

The former Corbin Church laying west along former Route 82 from the Corbin post office is now Bear Creek Church, and Missouri Route 82 has been realigned to the south.  The former Route 82 alignment is now NE 320 Rd. through the former location of Corbin.  The road joins modern Route 82 to the east, and ends to the west where the now inundated and wider Weaubleau Creek lies in the Truman Reservoir Management Lands.

References

Ghost towns in Missouri
Former populated places in St. Clair County, Missouri